Matthew Carlson (birth name Matt James Carlson; born February 10, 1951) is an  American television producer and writer.

He is best known for his work on the series Malcolm in the Middle and The Wonder Years. He was nominated for two Primetime Emmy Awards for his work on the latter series.

Carlson's other television credits include Townies, God, the Devil and Bob, Camp Wilder, The Boys Are Back, Men Behaving Badly (creating all the aforementioned series), Big Day, Samantha Who?, Sons of Tucson, Mr. Sunshine and Alexa & Katie.

Carlson also wrote the screenplay for the 1994 film Wagons East starring John Candy and Richard Lewis.

In his latest work, he wrote the Disney+'s original series The Mighty Ducks: Game Changers' episode 5, "Cherry Picker".

References

External links

1951 births
Living people
American film producers
American male screenwriters
American television producers
American television writers
Place of birth missing (living people)
American male television writers